Asbjørn Haugstvedt (20 November 1926 – 26 June 2008) was a Norwegian politician for the Christian Democratic Party. He was President of the Odelsting 1977–1981 and Minister of Trade and Shipping 1983–1986, as well as minister of Nordic cooperation 1983–1986. Haugstvedt was also a member of the Norwegian Parliament in the period from 1969 to 1985.

References

1926 births
2008 deaths
Ministers of Trade and Shipping of Norway
Members of the Storting
Christian Democratic Party (Norway) politicians
20th-century Norwegian politicians